Brekke is a village in the northeastern part of Gulen Municipality in Vestland county, Norway.  The village of Brekke has a population (2001) of 299 people.

Location

The village is located in the eastern part of the municipality on the southern shore of the Sognefjorden and the small Risnesfjorden inlet that branches off the main fjord. Brekke sits about a  drive from the village of Eivindvik, the municipal center of Gulen Municipality.

History

The old Brekke Municipality existed from 1850 until 1861 and then again from 1905 until 1964.  The administrative center of the municipality of Brekke was the village of Brekke.  The school, post office, Brekke Church, and municipal administration were all located in this village.

Name
The municipality is named after the old Brekke farm since Brekke Church was located there.  The name is identical to the old Norwegian word meaning "slope", probably since the village is built on the slopes leading down to the fjord.

Climate
Brekke and its surroundings are notable as one of the wettest parts of Norway. In the summer of 1964, Brekke received  of rain, making that the wettest summer on record.

References

Villages in Vestland
Gulen